The Wharton Borough School District is a comprehensive community public school district that serves students in kindergarten through eighth grade from Wharton, in Morris County, New Jersey, United States.

As of the 2018–19 school year, the district, comprising two schools, had an enrollment of 738 students and 73.7 classroom teachers (on an FTE basis), for a student–teacher ratio of 10.0:1.

The district is classified by the New Jersey Department of Education as being in District Factor Group "DE", the fifth-highest of eight groupings. District Factor Groups organize districts statewide to allow comparison by common socioeconomic characteristics of the local districts. From lowest socioeconomic status to highest, the categories are A, B, CD, DE, FG, GH, I and J.

Public school students in ninth through twelfth grades attend Morris Hills High School, located in Rockaway Borough, and which also serves portions of Rockaway Borough and Rockaway Township. As of the 2018–19 school year, the high school had an enrollment of 1,279 students and 118.4 classroom teachers (on an FTE basis), for a student–teacher ratio of 10.8:1. The high school is part of the Morris Hills Regional High School District, which also includes students from Denville Township, who attend Morris Knolls High School along with students from parts of Rockaway Borough and Rockaway Township.

Awards and recognition
Marie V. Duffy School was recognized by Governor Jim McGreevey in 2003 as one of 25 schools selected statewide for the First Annual Governor's School of Excellence award.

Schools 
Schools in the district (with 2018–19 enrollment data from the National Center for Education Statistics) are:
Marie V. Duffy Elementary School with 462 students in grades K - 5
Pamela S. Blalock, Principal
Alfred C. MacKinnon Middle School with 271 students in grades 6 - 8
Robert Hayzler, Principal

Administration
Core members of the district's administration are:
Christopher Herdman, Superintendent
Sandy Cammarata, Business Administrator / Board Secretary
Kenneth Russo: Director of Curriculum

Board of education
The district's board of education, with seven members, sets policy and oversees the fiscal and educational operation of the district through its administration. As a Type II school district, the board's trustees are elected directly by voters to serve three-year terms of office on a staggered basis, with either two or three seats up for election each year held (since 2012) as part of the November general election. The board appoints a superintendent to oversee the day-to-day operation of the district.

References

External links 
Wharton Borough Public Schools

Wharton Borough Public Schools, National Center for Education Statistics

Wharton, New Jersey
New Jersey District Factor Group DE
School districts in Morris County, New Jersey